Blumer is a surname of German origin, from the word blume, meaning "flower". It may refer to:

Bob Blumer (born 1962), Canadian cookbook writer and television host
David Blumer (born 1986), Swiss football player
Deborah Blumer (1941–2006), American politician
Elano Blumer (born 1981), Brazilian football player
George Alder Blumer (1857–1940), American psychiatrist
Herbert Blumer (1900–1987), American sociologist
Jairo Luis Blumer (born 1986), Brazilian football player
Johann Jakob Blumer (1819–1875), Swiss judge
Liselotte Blumer (born 1957), Swiss badminton player 
Othmar Blumer (1848–1900), Swiss politician 
Randy Blumer (born 1958), Canadian businessman
Scrappy Blumer (1917–1997), American fighter pilot
Theodor Blumer (1881–1964), German composer

See also
Bloomer (surname)

German-language surnames